Alphonse Clément André Brondy, known as Mattéo Brondy, (April 9, 1886 in Paris -1944 in Meknes, Morocco) was a French military veterinarian and painter.

Brondy is best known for the paintings of Morocco that became travel posters. His first works, exhibited from 1909 at the Salon des Indépendants and the French Artists Salon, met with success (animal studies, landscapes of Italy, Portugal, Spain).

Works 

 Fantasia devant la casbah
 Meknes 'Ses Remparts - Ses Cortèges Marocains' (1927)
 Fantasia au Maroc [Fantasia in Morocco]
 Chameaux sur la route de Meknès 
 Moulay-Idriss La Ville Sainte Du Djebel Zehroun

References 

1886 births
1944 deaths
French painters
French veterinarians